Comic Con Scotland is a fan convention held annually in Edinburgh, Scotland that celebrates films, cult television, video gaming, anime, cosplay and comic books which is organised by UK Events company Monopoly Events.

History and organisation
Comic Con Scotland began its annual run of events in 2018 after Scottish fans of other events organized by Monopoly Events approached the company's CEO Andy Kleek and requested a similar event to the already successful Comic Con Liverpool but in the East of Scotland. Kleek saw a gap in the market and moved to fill it immediately with a brand new annual event for the people of Edinburgh and its surrounding areas. Like many other events globally during the COVID-19 pandemic, the event suffered cancellation and rescheduling twice before lockdowns in the United Kingdom and specifically Scotland were lifted and the event was able to continue its run with the October 2022 event.

Monopoly Events is a Manchester-based event organization company that specializes in events held in the North West of England and Scotland. Along with the Comic Con Liverpool event, they are also responsible for organizing Comic Con Scotland, For the Love of Wrestling, For the Love of Sci-Fi, For the Love of Horror, For the Love of Fantasy, and Comic Con Manchester. The new Scottish event ran over two consecutive days and had a 80's and 90's theme subtitled For the Love of 80's and For the Love of 90's and it features prop builds and guests from shows and films of these eras.

The convention consistently includes celebrity guest appearances from various film, television, video gaming, anime and comic book series including Doctor Who, Star Trek, Star Wars, Battlestar Galactica, Sons of Anarchy, Back to the Future and others.

The first event in Edinburgh in November 2018 was held in the Edinburgh International Conference Centre or EICC for short in the city centre. The event was spread out across the entirety of the large city centre venue with the traders' hall being held in the large Cromdale Hall area, the celebrity guest area and prop builds in the larger Lennox Suite, celebrity panel talks in the Sidlaw Auditorium and the cosplay competition and masquerade held in the Lammermuir Suite. However, due to the first year attendance being so high and plans for future events which would exceed the capacity of the EICC, the decision was made by Monopoly Events to move Comic Con Scotland to the much larger Royal Highland Centre, an exhibition centre and showground located at Ingliston in the western outskirts of Edinburgh, adjacent to Edinburgh Airport and the A8, allowing for a wider demographic of visitors from around the globe, higher numbers of attendance and ergo, a much higher calibre of celebrity guest, larger prop builds, additional set builds, and a larger trader area.

The convention as it is now run across one vast exhibition hall called The Highland Hall as one large space. The exhibition hall features a large dealers zone selling movie, comic and science fiction related memorabilia, artwork, and collectibles as well as various film props and sets (something for which the Monopoly Events is famous for, making their event experiences very different from others like them within the UK), vehicles from different franchises, a stage for celebrity guest question and answer panels, celebrity guest professional photoshoots and autograph sessions, cosplay events, and other displays as well as a food court area.

In 2018 during the very first Comic Con Scotland hosted by Monopoly Events in November 2018, Incredible Hulk actor Lou Ferrigno celebrated his 67th birthday alongside fellow actors Sam J. Jones, Gil Gerard, Zach Galligan, Sylvester McCoy, Herbert Jefferson Jr., and Ray Parker Jr. where the stars presented Ferrigno with a Hulk themed birthday cake.

Venue
As of 2019 Comic Con Scotland is held exclusively at Royal Highland Centre, originally the Royal Highland Showground, is an exhibition centre and showground located at Ingliston in the western outskirts of Edinburgh. The centre welcomes over 1 million visitors annually to a wide range of events. The largest event is the Royal Highland Show, which attracts over 200,000 visitors each year.

Effect of 2020 COVID-19 pandemic
The 2020 Comic Con Scotland event was canceled in May 2020 due to the ongoing COVID-19 pandemic. Andy Kleek of Monopoly Events stated that "The positive news is that virtually all the headline guests that were going to appear this year have said they will do next year, which is a huge bonus and a positive all round." Guests confirmed for the event to date included Alicia Silverstone, Michael Madsen, Steve Guttenberg, Joey Cramer, Frank Welker, and Peter Cullen. The event was again cancelled due to Scottish lockdown rules in 2021 and went ahead 8-9 October 2022.

Show features

Celebrity guests 
As with many other fan convention events, celebrity guests from past and present popular media are regularly invited to Comic Con Scotland and are an extremely popular part of the event, posing for professional photographs with fans and providing autographs as well as giving fans the chance to meet them and chat in person. Monopoly Events is well known for bringing first-time guests to the UK, as well as guests that are from older cult film and television shows of past decades such as the 1980s and 1990s. Sometimes the celebrities involved will use their appearances to raise awareness and funds for a charity or cause important to them, while others use the opportunity to promote upcoming projects such as new films or television shows.

Celebrity panels 
Most, if not all, of the celebrity guests at Comic Con Scotland, appear on stage at some point throughout the course of the event, answering both host and fan questions alike. At the first Comic Con Scotland event held at the Edinburgh International Conference Centre, the panels took place in a side auditorium with tiered seating. As of the 2019 event, which was the first to take place in the new and much larger Royal Highland Centre venue, the stage is built in the main hall where anyone on the floor is free to attend the talks.

Celebrity meet & greet experiences 
Some of the celebrity guests agree to a 30-minute meet & greet experience, this experience is at an additional cost to the entry ticket, is much more intimate than meeting a guest at a signing table or photograph area, and takes place in a room away from the main event. During the experience the celebrity or celebrities will chat and mingle with up to 30 fans at a time, away from the louder main event crowds, sharing conversation and taking selfie photographs as souvenirs.

Photographs 
Comic Con Scotland includes a double professional photoshoot area where fans can have their photo taken with their favourite guest or guests before collecting them at the exit of the area.

Autographs 
The event also includes an autograph area where celebrity guests from film and TV sign items for the public and spend a few minutes chatting with their fans.

Cosplay 
A large part of the event is devoted to the cosplay hobby where members of the public are allowed, and encouraged, to take part in dressing up as characters from popular genres such as film and television. Cosplaying has become one of the most popular parts of many fan conventions around the world and can be used as a platform to showcase the costumer's latest handywork, to show devotion to their favourite characters or engage in role-play with other cosplayers in the same series, as well as to meet new people with mutual interests as themselves. The Comic Con Scotland event, like all of the Monopoly Events shows, hosts a cosplay competition every year with both adult and child participation encouraged and prizes given for the best costumes.

Prop and set exhibits
Monopoly Events is famous for providing a vast array of props and set builds for its visitors to enjoy, with Comic Con Scotland being no exception, visitors can find exhibits such as a full-sized X-wing fighter from Star Wars, the Tardis from Doctor Who, the DeLorean Time Machine from Back to the Future, a full-sized Peterbilt Truck from Transformers and much more.

Retro gaming area
Comic Con Scotland has a large area dedicated to retro gaming consoles for visitors to play.

Trader zone
Within the main exhibition hall, there is a large trader zone that contains many dealers selling film and television, comic and science fiction related memorabilia, comics, games, artwork, toys and collectibles.

Artists alley
The event has a large Artists Alley section within the trader zone where the public can meet published comic book artists and buy pieces of their work, as well as independent artists who are selling their original work.

Location, dates and notable guests

See also
 List of comic book conventions
 Comic book convention
 List of multigenre conventions

References

External links
 
 Monopoly Events Official Website

Multigenre conventions
Science fiction conventions in the United Kingdom
Recurring events established in 2018
Comics conventions
Fan conventions
British fan conventions
Events in Scotland